Sergio González (born 3 July 1925) is a Mexican former sailor who competed in the 1964 Summer Olympics.  He graduated from National Autonomous University of Mexico and Harvard University.

References

1925 births
Living people
Mexican male sailors (sport)
Olympic sailors of Mexico
Sailors at the 1964 Summer Olympics – Flying Dutchman
National Autonomous University of Mexico alumni
Harvard University alumni
20th-century Mexican people